Abadan University of Medical Sciences is a medical school in Iran.  It was founded by Ministry of Health and Medical Education in September 1941 as a Nursing Faculty and in 2012 it became an independent faculty of medical school. Program study of this school is similar to curriculum that applies most Iranian medical faculties. 
Abadan city is located in Khuzestan Province, central west of Iran. It lies on Abadan Island (68 km long, 3–19 km wide) which is bounded in the west by the Arvand waterway and to the east by the Bahmanshir outlet of the Karun River, 53 kilometers from the Persian Gulf, near the Iraqi-Iran border.

Medical and nursing schools are the major schools of Abadan medical university. Basic sciences and pathophysiology district is two main district of medical school.
Basic sciences district is composed of various parts included; chemistry, biochemistry, molecular biology lab, anatomy hall, hematology lab, microbiology lab, parasitology lab, histopathology lab, immunology lab, and medical physiology lab.

The Anatomy hall is the oldest and largest basic sciences part in Abadan school of Medical Sciences, established in 1992. The department involves three different major divisions of histology, embryology, and anatomy. The department provides educational facilities such as dissection halls, hall of anatomic models, histology laboratories and laboratories for undergraduate students

External links
 

Abadan, Iran
Nursing schools in Iran
Medical schools in Iran